Hinsdale may refer to:

Places
In the United States:
Hinsdale, Illinois
Hinsdale station, on Metra's BNSF Railway Line
Hinsdale, Massachusetts
Hinsdale, Montana
Hinsdale, New Hampshire, a New England town
Hinsdale (CDP), New Hampshire, the main village in the town
Hinsdale, New York
Hinsdale County, Colorado

People
Grace Webster Haddock Hinsdale (1832–1902), American author
Reynold Hinsdale (1878–1934), American architect

Other uses
USS Hinsdale (APA-120), US Navy ship named for Hinsdale County, Colorado